Kärin Nickelsen (born 1972) is a German historian of science whose works have included books on eighteenth-century botanical illustration, photosynthesis, and life-support systems for human spaceflight. She is a professor at Ludwig Maximilian University of Munich.

Education and career
Nickelsen earned a diploma at the University of Göttingen in 1999, and completed her Ph.D. in 2002 at the University of Bern in Switzerland. She became an assistant professor at the University of Bern, was promoted to associate professor in 2006, and completed a habilitation there in 2010. In 2011 she took her present position as professor for the History of Science at Ludwig Maximilian University of Munich.

Books
Nickelsen is the author of:
Draughtsmen, Botanists and Nature: The Construction of Eighteenth-Century Botanical Illustrations (Springer, 2006)
The Maximum Quantum Yield Controversy: Otto Warburg and the "Midwest-Gang" (with Govindjee, Bern Studies in the History and Philosophy of Science, 2011)
Explaining Photosynthesis: Models of Biochemical Mechanisms, 1840–1960 (Springer, 2015)
Far Beyond the Moon: A History of Life Support Systems in the Space Age (with David P. D. Munns, University of Pittsburgh Press, 2020)

Recognition
She was elected to the Academia Europaea in 2020.

References

External links
Home page

1972 births
Living people
21st-century German historians
German women historians
Historians of science
University of Göttingen alumni
University of Bern alumni
Academic staff of the University of Bern
Academic staff of the Ludwig Maximilian University of Munich
Members of the German Academy of Sciences Leopoldina
Members of Academia Europaea